The El Salto Formation is a geologic formation in Nicaragua. It preserves fossils dating back to the Pliocene period.

Fossil content 
 Mysticeti indet.

See also 
 List of fossiliferous stratigraphic units in Nicaragua

References

Bibliography 
 

Geologic formations of Nicaragua
Neogene Nicaragua
Paleontology in Nicaragua
Shale formations
Sandstone formations
Deltaic deposits
Formations